Ramisyllis is a small genus of polychaete annelid marine worms. Both species are characterised by their branching body plans. Both species are found in shallow water, with R. multicaudata native to Darwin Harbour, Australia, and R. kingghidorahi native to the Sea of Japan near Sado Island, Japan.

Species
 Ramisyllis multicaudata
 Ramisyllis kingghidorahi

References

Polychaete genera
Bioluminescent annelids
Syllidae